Nandito Ako  (English: Here I Am) is a television mini-series in the Philippines. It was produced by TV5, and was broadcast from February 20 to March 23, 2012.

The programme was the second Mini Serye by TV5, and like the first one, Sa Ngalan ng Ina (lit. In the Name of the Mother), it was also set to air for only a month.

Synopsis
International singing star Josh Bradley is a Filipino-American who was born and raised in the Philippines. When he was six years old, he was separated from his mother, Cara, during a hotel fire, who was believed to have died. After the incident, Josh moved to the United States, beginning his musical career. Years later, Josh returns to the Philippines to find out what really happened to his mother and search for the little girl he encountered and befriended during the hotel fire.

Cast and characters

Main cast

Extended cast

Guest cast / special appearance

Trivia
The theme song of the mini-soap opera with the same title was originally performed by singer-songwriter Ogie Alcasid and later remade by Mexican diva, Thalia.
Gelli de Belen and Aiko Melendez both worked in the series. However, their husbands Ariel Rivera and Jomari Yllana (Aiko's ex-husband) recently worked in ABS-CBN's E-Boy respectively.
This is David Archuleta's first Filipino and only Asian TV project.

See also
List of programs broadcast by TV5 (Philippines)
List of shows previously aired by TV5

References

External links
 Follow Archuleta
 

TV5 (Philippine TV network) drama series
2012 Philippine television series debuts
2012 Philippine television series endings
Philippine drama television series
Philippine television miniseries
2010s television miniseries
Filipino-language television shows